is a Japanese short track speed skater. She competed in the women's 3000 metre relay event at the 1992 Winter Olympics.

References

1966 births
Living people
Japanese female short track speed skaters
Olympic short track speed skaters of Japan
Short track speed skaters at the 1992 Winter Olympics
Sportspeople from Tokyo
Asian Games medalists in short track speed skating
Short track speed skaters at the 1986 Asian Winter Games
Medalists at the 1986 Asian Winter Games
Asian Games gold medalists for Japan
Asian Games silver medalists for Japan
Asian Games bronze medalists for Japan
20th-century Japanese women